is an original Japanese anime television series animated by Sunrise Beyond. A photonovel series titled Kyōkai Senki: Frost Flower has been serialized in Hobby Japan's Monthly Hobby Japan magazine since July 2021. The series aired from October 2021 to June 2022.

Plot
In the mid-20th century, due to economic crisis and a collapsing birthrate, Japan was on the verge of becoming a failed state. In response, foreign nations sent forces to intervene. However, foreign intervention quickly became a foreign occupation, and the competing foreign nations started the destructive Boundary War, fought with autonomous drone mecha called AMAIMs. 

By the year 2061, the Boundary War has ended but Japan has been divided into four occupied zones where native Japanese are treated like second-class citizens. In the wake of the resulting social upheaval and unrest, a young boy named Amō Shiiba stumbles across an abandoned AMAIM called Kenbu and a rogue autonomous AI named Gai. With Kenbu and Gai, Amō has the opportunity to change the course of history for both himself and the entire nation of Japan.

Characters

Main characters

A 16-year-old boy orphaned by the Boundary Wars, he became a mechanic after discovering an abandoned AMAIM workshop, in which he found a left-over human-piloted, interface-comtrolled AMAIM unit, whose name Gai identifies as "Kenbu", and later becomes its designated pilot. While shy and kind, he enjoys any new experiences he makes.

A mecha pilot ace for the Japanese resistance group Yatagarasu. His father was the previous pilot of his AMAIM unit "Jogan", but he was killed, leaving Tezuka embittered about Japan's occupation.

An autonomous AI unit with a grandiloquent but loyal personality. After he is rescued by Amō, he finishes assembling the Kendu for him and acts as the AMAIN's control computer. He is linked with the military and public information and communication networks, an asset which saves Amō more than once. His onscreen avatar is an over-fluffed, scarlet red Komainu.

Tezuka's AI control unit controlling "Jogan". Her avatar is a white kitsune.

 Shion's ANAIM AI control unit. His avatar form is a purple Jakalope with hooves.

Yatagarasu

The leader of Yatagarasu Special Forces Group Two.

A friendly leading member of Yatagarasu whose family was killed in a crash with an Asia Entente car, whose drivers were unjustly cleared of any wrongdoing. She is killed when the Ghost attacks the camp shortly after Amō's arrival.

The Special Forces Group Two's chief mechanic.

Arahabaki

Confederation of Oceania

A ruthless Oceania officer who despises his duty in Japan and therefore seeks to reap merits by any means necessary.

A female Oceania lieutenant and Wilson's subordinate.

North America Coalition

A captain of the North American Coalition. An exceptionally skilled military analyst, he is intrigued by the concept of piloted AMAIMs.

An American warrant officer, and Watt's subordinate and friend.

Asia Free Trade Entente

Federation of Great Eurasia

A.R.E.S

Brenson Corp

Others

Media

Photonovel
A photonovel series titled  began serialization in Hobby Japan's Monthly Hobby Japan magazine since July 21, 2021.

Anime
Sunrise Beyond and Bandai Spirits revealed the project on March 16, 2021. The series is directed by Nobuyoshi Habara and written by Noboru Kimura. Character designs are provided by Kenichi Ohnuki, while Rasmus Faber is composing the music. It aired from October 5 to December 28, 2021, on TV Tokyo, MBS and BS11. Blank Paper performed the series' opening theme song "enemy". Funimation licensed the series outside of Asia. Just right after the first part ended, a second part was announced, and aired from April 12 to June 28, 2022.

On April 11, 2022, Crunchyroll announced that the series will receive an English dub, which premiered on April 25.

Episode list

Reception
Anime News Network felt the main protagonist was generally unoriginal and uninspired. They were also critical of the story, calling its political aspects poorly-executed. In their review, Anime Feminist felt that the anime contains content of nationalism and anti-immigration ideas. They felt the introduction part of the anime's first episode can be summarized as "we let foreigners in and they outbred us, and now the True Japanese People are being subjugated by the foreign powers they heralded".

Bilibili removal
Chinese streaming website Bilibili removed the series from its service due to the portrayal of Asian foreign powers as human traffickers in the fifth episode, "Determination".

Notes

References

External links
 Anime official website 
 

Anime with original screenplays
Crunchyroll anime
Funimation
Fiction set in 2061
Hobby Japan manga
Mecha anime and manga
Sunrise (company)
Television censorship in China
TV Tokyo original programming
Works banned in China